The California Society of Anesthesiologists (CSA), Inc., is a component society of the American Society of Anesthesiologists, Inc., in the state of California.

History
CSA was founded in 1948 and incorporated in 1953 as a voluntary, non-profit association of physicians specializing in anesthesiology practicing in California. Today, the elected officers and Board of Directors are individuals dedicated to the preservation of the unique specialty of anesthesiology. The CSA works closely with the ASA to protect the interests of all anesthesiologists, on a national, state and local level.

Mission of the organization
The California Society of Anesthesiologists is a physician organization dedicated to promoting the highest standards of the profession of anesthesiology, to fostering excellence through continuing medical education, and to serving as an advocate for anesthesiologists and their patients.

Governance
The CSA is governed by its House of Delegates, which is composed of CSA Delegates, district directors (designated by geographic distribution) and CSA Officers. The House of Delegates meets each year during the Society's Annual Meeting in May. During the interim between the meetings of the House of Delegates, the CSA Board of Directors exercises authority to manage the business and financial affairs of the Society, and works to implement and complement the Society's goals, consistent with the policies of the House of Delegates. The Board of Directors meets four times each year. Between meetings of the Board, the CSA Executive Committee meets to discuss specific matters which would ordinarily require special meetings of the Board.

Notable members
 Michele E. Raney of the American Polar Society has been a board member of the Society.

References

External links
 http://www.csahq.org/

Organizations based in California